Ticket to Paradise may refer to:

 Ticket to Paradise (1936 film), an American drama film directed by Aubrey Scotto
 Ticket to Paradise (1961 film), a British comedy film directed by Francis Searle
 Ticket to Paradise (2008 film), a Danish feature documentary film directed by Janus Metz
 Ticket to Paradise (2011 film), a Cuban drama film written and directed by Gerardo Chijona
 Ticket to Paradise (2022 film), an American romantic comedy film starring George Clooney and Julia Roberts

See also
 "Two Tickets to Paradise", a 1978 song by Eddie Money
 Two Tickets to Paradise (film), an unrelated 2006 film